Ultimate Victory is the second studio album by American rapper Chamillionaire. It was released on September 14, 2007. The album debuted at number 8 on the US Billboard 200 chart, selling 79,000 copies in the first week. It is notable for not containing any profanity. In all, the album has sold 700,000 copies in the U.S.

Critical reception

Ultimate Victory was generally well received by music critics.

Rolling Stone gave note of Chamillionaire's subject matter detailing his disdain towards the "record industry, money-grubbing ex-friends and lazy rappers" while backing up his sentiments with tracks like the Bun B-assisted "Pimp Mode" and "We Breakin' Up". They concluded by praising the closing title track stating, "“The Ultimate Victory”—on which Chamillionaire expresses sympathy for media-dogged celebrities like Eminem and Britney Spears and admits, "I'm still filled with doubt"—might be the most personally reflective hip-hop track since Slim Shady himself stepped to the mic."

Despite finding a few duds in the track listing, AllMusic's David Jeffries called the album "[A] positive outlook for the future of the genre", praising Cham's pedigree to deliver "verse-filled hip-hop" by smartly utilizing top-notch production and guest artists to deliver catchy songs with substance, concluding that "Ultimate Victory is a brilliant way to recover from overexposure and bring things back to a more sensible level if a long-term, credible career is what's at stake."

Edna Gundersen from USA Today found the record to be "a surprisingly counterintuitive hip-hop journey", noting its lack of profanity, Cham's criticism on the "materialistic bent and greedy sycophants" that represent the genre, and showing empathy for his fellow artists under media scrutiny, concluding that "Victory ultimately is achieved through Chamillionaire’s charged flow, snappy taunts and unexpected singing talents."

Thomas A. Harden of XXL commended Cham's aggressive delivery towards media gossip, the hip-hop industry and government politics but felt that it "comes off preachy, rather than poetic." He added that said approach works better when its added with "a spoonful of sugar with his doses of hip-hop medicine ("I Think I Love You"), flexes his lyrical skills ("You Must Be Crazy") or just has fun on the mic ("The Ultimate Vacation")."

PopMatters contributor Josh Timmermann also found Cham being try-hard when tackling tabloid news and politics, but praised his forays into more conventional topics with solid beats and relaxed flows. Timmermann concluded by praising Cham's performance on the title track, saying "it's convincing proof that there might, after all, be life after "Ridin'" for a rapper who previously seemed bound for one-hit wonder status."

Track listing

Samples
"The Morning News"
"Segue II" by The New Power Generation
"Hip Hop Police
"Gin and Juice" by Snoop Dogg
"Murder Was the Case" by Snoop Dogg
"Industry Groupie"
"The Final Countdown" by Europe
"The Ultimate Victory"
"Pollution" by Baby Bash
"Standing Ovation"
"Reign" by Kurt Carr

Charts

Bonus DVD
Chamillionaire released his Bonus DVD to Ultimate Victory. This DVD is only in exclusive double-pack in BET Edition available at Wal-Mart.

DVD features are:
ACCESS GRANTED: "Turn It Up", "Ridin'", "Grown & Sexy", "Hip-Hop Police"/"Evening News"
106 & PARK: Chamillionaire Interview
BET Spring Bling 2007 Performance
BET Black Collage Tour
Fly Rydes

Music videos:
"Hip Hop Police"
"The Evening News"

Release history

References

Chamillionaire albums
2007 albums
Universal Records albums
Albums produced by Happy Perez
Albums produced by J. R. Rotem
Albums produced by Kane Beatz
Albums produced by Rick Rock
Albums produced by the Runners
Chamillitary Entertainment albums